The Men's 50 metre rifle prone singles event took place at 13 October 2010 at the CRPF Campus. There was a qualification round held to determine the finalists.

Results

External links
Report

Shooting at the 2010 Commonwealth Games